The Foxbusters is a British animated TV series very loosely based on the Dick King-Smith book The Foxbusters. It was made by Cosgrove Hall, and consists of two series of thirteen 11-minute episodes each, made between 1999 and 2000. The show was co-written by the animation partnership of David Max Freedman and Alan Gilbey, and occasionally with Joel Jessup as a third writer. It was directed by Jon Doyle. The show itself is laden with gags and action. It also won two major awards in 2000; a BAFTA for "Best Animated Series"  and the British Animation Awards for "Best Children's Series". Subsequently the show earned a cult following, particularly in the furry fandom.

Plot 
The show is primarily set on Foxearth Farm, a fictional farm based in the English countryside in the West Midlands, which is dominated by a variety of animals, particularly the chickens. The Foxbusters are three chickens, Ransome, Sims, and Jeffries, who have the unlikely ability to fly. Each has a different personality; Ransome is the best flyer, Sims is the smartest and Jeffries is the comic relief. The Foxbusters also have the ability to spit grit like machine guns, and drop hard-boiled eggs like they were bombs - and these are used to effect among other methods to keep the hungry pack of foxes in Foxearth Forest at bay.

Characters

The Foxbusters
 Ransome - The best flyer of the Foxbusters, Ransome is cocky and arrogant; she has the biggest fanbase on the farmyard and is often looking for new ways to impress the other farm animals. She is often seen arguing with her sister Sims and has a big ego. Unlike her British-accented sisters, she speaks in an African-American accent, due to her voice actress' unique accent. She is voiced by Whoopi Goldberg.
 Sims - The oldest, thinnest, and smartest of the three sisters, Sims organizes the ways the Foxbusters co-ordinate their defenses on the farmyard against the foxes. and is often conniving new and inventive ways of deferring the foxes from the farm. She is the most serious of the sisters. She is voiced by Joanna Lumley.
 Jeffries - Jeffries, being the largest and least capable flyer, makes her mark as the comedian of the trio. She is typically on the outside and doesn't want to seriously harm the foxes, but still defends the farm with the same vigor as her sisters when required. She is even friendly with Todd, one of the foxes (who is also ironically on the outside) as shown in Winging It. She is voiced by Jane Horrocks.

The Foxes
 King Voracious - The leader of the foxes and main antagonist of the series, Voracious is a large, handsome, and charismatic red fox who is a somewhat unstable and sadistic character. He sometimes appears to lose authority in the pack of foxes, but at the same time still leads them into constantly (and unsuccessfully) trying to get the better of the chickens. Despite being a fox, his appearance and model is more similar to that of a wolf. He is voiced by Rob Rackstraw.
 Attila - A young and ragged fox who notably only has one eye (how he lost his other eye is never explained), Attila is devious and cunning, but is also rather volatile, especially whenever his plans go wrong (as they often do). He is often depicted as Voracious' second-in-command. He has occasionally shown a more lighthearted and more playful side. He is usually scheming with his sister, Evita. He is voiced by Rob Rackstraw.
 Evita -A young vixen who is Attila's sister and as such, they are often seen working together. Like Attila, she is cunning and mean spirited, but is also incredibly resourceful. She is typically humourless and practical like Attila, but has too the occasional scenes of comic relief. She is sometimes depicted to be in a relationship with another fox called Vlad. She is voiced by Joanna Lumley.
 Todd - Often working together with Attila and Evita, Todd is nothing like most of the other foxes. He is not very smart and is often accident-prone. He also does not seem to understand why the other foxes are trying to capture the chickens and thus acts neutrally, but often is seen helping out in the foxes' plans, and the undoing of them. He is voiced by Jimmy Hibbert.
 Queen Voracity - Voracious' mate. She is pompous, arrogant and she does not get on with Voracious very well (although the feeling is mutual). She is voiced by Joanna Lumley.
 Ghengis - A fox cub who is Voracious' and Voracity's son. He rarely speaks, and instead appears to be more interested in biting any living thing that comes near him. Thus the other foxes are very reluctant to babysit him, as he is also hard to entertain. He is voiced by Jimmy Hibbert.
 Volpone - One of the oldest foxes in the forest and Voracious' father. Once the leader of the foxes before being succeeded by his son, he is now occasionally left with the unpopular task of babysitting his grandson Ghengis. Like Voracious, he looks different from the other foxes. Though unlike him, his appearance is of a brown coyote. He believes the simplest ways are the best, as opposed to the more creative and elaborate schemes the other foxes seem to favor. He is voiced by Jimmy Hibbert.

Recurring
Rotter - A devious and unnaturally terrestrial otter who is a recurring character in some of the episodes, serving as a middle man between the foxes and the farmyard animals. Rotter craves for chicken eggs instead of fish and small mammals like a real-world otter. He believes that he is a skilled egg thief and has even tried plotting on turning the foxes and chickens against each other for his own benefit, but is often found out before he can fulfil his plans. He also has a romantic interest in a female otter, named Carlotta, who occasionally has even outsmarted him. He is voiced by Jimmy Hibbert.
Icky - Ransome, Sims and Jeffries' older brother. Icky is constantly envious of his sisters taking all of the glory for tackling the fox problem on the farm. He is rather clumsy and easily gets carried away. This leads to him getting into a fight with King Voracious, only for his sisters to rescue him. He is voiced by Rob Rackstraw.
Dog - The farmer's sheepdog who has a good relationship with all of the farmyard animals, and as such is in command of the farmer's sheep. He is usually seen with the farmer. He was elected to be the leader of the farm by a landslide (his opponents were Ransome and Sims respectively), but soon resigned when he realized he could not fulfill the promises he made, and subsequently handed the role of leader back to the Foxbusters. He is voiced by Jimmy Hibbert.
Farmer Farmer - The constantly cheerful owner of Foxearth Farm, Farmer Farmer is totally oblivious to the fox problem in the nearby forest and the fact that three of his chickens can fly. He spends most of his time with his dog, lazing about and eating picnics in the nearby fields, but is occasionally seen doing farmwork. He is voiced by Rob Rackstraw.

Cast
Whoopi Goldberg - Ransome
Jane Horrocks - Jeffries
Joanna Lumley - Sims/Evita/Voracity
Rob Rackstraw - Voracious/Attila/Icky/Farmer Farmer/Various others
Jimmy Hibbert - Todd/Volpone/Rotter/Dog/Ghengis/Various others

Episodes
on the beginning of the Foxbusters Pilot, it was to be set during the Second World War as evident in the 1997 Pilot, but this idea was phased out: as evident in some episodes, the series is clearly set during the present day.

Series 1 (1999)

Series 2 (2000)

International broadcasts

Home video releases
On January 13, 2003, Cinema Club and Granada Media released 2 DVDs and videos of The Foxbusters worldwide, one with episodes 1–6 of the first series, and one with episodes 7-13.

References

External links
Official website (archived)

Toonhound's entry on The Foxbusters

1990s British children's television series
1999 British television series debuts
2000s British children's television series
2000 British television series endings
Australian Broadcasting Corporation original programming
British children's animated comedy television series
British television shows based on children's books
English-language television shows
BAFTA winners (television series)
Television series about chickens
Animated television series about foxes
ITV children's television shows
Television shows produced by Anglia Television
Television series by ITV Studios
Television series by Cosgrove Hall Films